Dil Kabaddi is an Indian Hindi film directed by debutante Anil Sharma. The film stars Irrfan Khan, Rahul Bose, Konkona Sen Sharma, Soha Ali Khan, Payal Rohatgi, Rahul Khanna and special appearance by Rahat Fateh Ali Khan.

Synopsis
Set in contemporary Mumbai, the movie takes a close look at the evolving equations among urban couples and paints the metamorphosis amongst the relationships with a comic stroke.

The film tracks the lives of two modern-day married couples – Samit Talpade and Mita Wadia; Rishi Sharma and Simi Ghatge – caught in web of boredom, loss of love and temptation.

The film starts with an announcement by Samit Talpade and Mita Wadia of their separation and follows the moral muddles and emotional crises of the couples over the next year and a half – as friends fight, separate, take lovers and, in a way, reconcile.

Cast 
 Irrfan Khan as Samit Talpade
 Rahul Bose as Rishi Sharma 
 Rahul Khanna as Rajveer Singh
 Konkona Sen Sharma as Simi Ghatge
 Soha Ali Khan as Mita Wadia
 Payal Rohatgi as Kaya Rao
 Saba Azad as Raga Malik
 Rahat Fateh Ali Khan as special appearance in the song "Zindagi Ye"

Soundtrack

The music for all the songs were composed by Sachin Gupta & Dhruv Dhalla and lyrics were penned by Virag Mishra.

Reception 
Sukanya Verma of  Rediff.com gave the film 2.5 out of 5, writing ″For most part, intermission to be specific, Dil Kabaddi keeps you involved with its amusing interactions and relatable characters. Strongly urban and individualistic, they haunt the hotspots (Vie Lounge, Sampan) and landmarks of Mumbai (yes Taj too), where the film is based, with distinct belonging and understated pride.″ Rajeev Masand of CNN-IBN gave the film 2.5 out of 5, writing ″Dil Kabaddi might have been an instant entertainer had director Anil Senior exercised a tighter grip on the screenplay, but because much of the film’s second act seems to go around in circles, the film is enjoyable but only in parts. I’m going with two out of five for director Anil Senior’s Dil Kabaddi; it’s a film with some wonderfully light moments that will leave you smiling from ear to ear. And for that, we have Woody Allen to thank.″
 
Gaurav Malani of The Economic Times gave the film 2 out of 5, writing ″Dil Kabaddi takes a sporty look at the game of hearts. Watch it for some 'hearty' laughs.  Kaveree Bamzai of India Today called it a ″ rip off of  Woody Allen's Husbands and Wives″, she further wrote ″The movie is kept alive by the smartness of its actors, who lend the occasionally dull screenplay a lot of spark.″  Taran Adarsh of Bollywood Hungama gave the film 1.5 out of 5, writing ″On the whole, DIL KABADDI has shock-value, but not a strong plot to leave an impact.″

References

External links 
 
 

2008 films
2000s Hindi-language films
Viacom18 Studios films